Almada is a city and a municipality in Portugal.

Almada may also refer to:

People 
Álvaro Vaz de Almada, 1st Count of Avranches (1390–1449), Portuguese nobleman
Enrique Almada (1934–1990), Uruguayan comedian
Fernando de Almada, 2nd Count of Avranches (1430–1496), Portuguese nobleman
José de Almada Negreiros (1893–1970), Portuguese artist 
Juan Carlos Almada (born 1962), former Argentine footballer
Lou Almada (1907–2005), Mexican-American baseball player
Luís Carlos Almada Soares (born 1986), Cape Verdean footballer
Mario Almada (actor) (1922–2016), Mexican actor
Mario Almada (field hockey) (born 1975), Argentine field hockey forward 
Martín Almada (born 1937), Paraguayan lawyer, writer and educationalist
Mel Almada (1913–1988), Mexican-American baseball player in Major League Baseball 
Nadia Almada (born 1977), British reality television star
Selva Almada (born 1973), Argentine writer
Thiago Almada (born 2001), Argentine footballer